The Crocker Art Museum is the oldest art museum in the Western United States, located in Sacramento, California. Founded in 1885, the museum holds one of the premier collections of Californian art. The collection includes American works dating from the Gold Rush to the present, European paintings and master drawings, one of the largest international ceramics collections in the U.S., and collections of Asian, African, and Oceanic art. The Crocker Art Museum has been accredited by the American Alliance of Museums, a high standard for US museums.

History
Edwin B. Crocker (1818–1875), a wealthy California lawyer and judge, and his wife, Margaret Crocker (1822–1901), began to assemble a significant collection of paintings and drawings during an extended trip to Europe, from 1869 to 1871. Upon their return to Sacramento, they set about creating an art gallery in part of their grand home at the corner of Third and O streets. When the gallery was completed they opened it to the public to fund the Sacramento Library. When it opened with 694 paintings the gallery boasted the largest privately collection in the country, and held more paintings than the Metropolitan Museum of Art. The gallery became of the hub of social activity in Sacramento, hosting benefits for local organizations and welcoming prominent visitors including the Hawaiian queen, Liliʻuokalani (1878), President Ulysses S. Grant (1879), and Oscar Wilde (1882).

E. B. Crocker died in 1875. In 1885, his widow loaned the gallery to the California Museum Association (CMA) for Central California's first Art and Curio Loan Exhibition. This exhibition went on for two weeks and was a complete success. When it finished, the CMA's President, David Lubin, asked that Margaret (and E.B. Crocker's three daughters, who had equal rights to the gallery through Crocker's will) donate the space to the museum association to ensure the long term preservation of the gallery. They agreed, but on the condition that they raised funds for upkeep that they were not able to reach. Instead, she gave the property to the city, which gave the association the right to occupy the property, and made Margaret Crocker the director. She presented the E. B. Crocker Art Gallery and collection to the City of Sacramento and the California Museum Association, "in trust for the public," the contents of which were valued at the time at more than $500,000. A school of art was established at the gallery in 1886.

In 1978, the Crocker Art Gallery was renamed the Crocker Art Museum. In 2002, to accommodate a burgeoning collection and the needs of the growing population of Sacramento and California's Central Valley region, the museum commissioned the firm of Gwathmey Siegel & Associates to design a major addition.  The greatly expanded Crocker Art Museum opened on October 10, 2010.

Permanent collections

Californian art and American art
The Californian art collection includes works dating from statehood to the present. The core collection of early Californian art was assembled by Judge E. B. and Margaret Crocker in the early 1870s. Prominent in their collection are works by the German-American artist Charles Christian Nahl, who brought the large scale and copious detail of European history painting to works depicting the California Gold Rush. The Crockers commissioned five major works from Nahl, including Sunday Morning in the Mines (1872).

The Californian collection continued to expand, and now contains 150 years of painting, sculpture, and craft media covering genres that include Impressionism, Abstract Expressionism, and Pop Art, and features artists including early Sacramento painter Amanda Austin, Norton Bush, William Keith, Thomas Hill, Granville Redmond, Edwin Deakin, Guy Rose, Gottardo Piazzoni, Joan Brown, Elmer Bischoff, Roland Petersen, David Park, Jess, Richard Diebenkorn, Mel Ramos, and Wayne Thiebaud.

The collection also includes American art from the late 19th century to the present. American impressionists and modernists are a particular strength, with artists including Childe Hassam, Robert Henri, Georgia O'Keeffe, Maynard Dixon, Marsden Hartley, Hans Hofmann, and Luis Cruz Azaceta.

European art

Original collection
The collection of European art began with the Crocker family's trip to Europe, from 1869 to 1871. It was not a Grand Tour. The Crockers rented lodgings in Dresden for over a year, and traveled mostly in Germany. As a later director of the museum would write, "Mr. Crocker was a novice and completely susceptible to a kind of fraud in his anxiety to become the possessor of a large collection of masterpieces. He acquired in his wholesale search a collection of more than 700 paintings,"  most of them "not by the few famous names given him by the dealers in Munich and Dresden." (Works said to be by Rembrandt, Rubens, Poussin, Salvator Rosa, and even Leonardo da Vinci appear in the initial 1876 catalogue, but were reattributed in following decades.) However, among Crocker's purchases were a number of genuinely rare works by a broader array of artists than he realized, and for a brief time the Crockers possessed the largest private art collection in the United States.

Along with paintings, the Crockers also acquired 1344 Old Master drawings "and untold numbers of prints of rare craftsmanship." Systematic study of the origin and significance of these drawings began only in the 21st century.

Of more certain provenance were the numerous German and Central European paintings Crocker purchased, many by artists who were alive and working at the time. These 19th-century paintings would form the core of the European collection, along with a number of 17th-century Flemish and Dutch Golden Age still lives and genre scenes, as well as French and Italian works of the 17th and 18th centuries. Artists represented in Crocker's original collection include Maarten van Heemskerck, Jan Brueghel the Elder, Klaes Molenaer, Pieter Quast, Antonio Joli, Francesco Solimena, Paolo de Matteis, Claude-Joseph Vernet, Jacques-Louis David, Andreas Achenbach, and Karl von Piloty.

Later acquisitions
Recent gifts by philanthropist Alan Templeton have expanded the scope of the European collection to include works by Italian artists Guercino, il Morazzone, and Bernardo Strozzi, the Swedish portrait painter Alexander Roslin, and French artists Simon Vouet, Philippe de Champaigne, Charles Poërson, Pierre-Alexandre Wille, Louis-Jean-François Lagrenée, and Robert Lefèvre, as well as English portraitist Sir Thomas Lawrence, Austrian painter Josef Danhauser, and
Dutch artist Abraham Hondius.

Gifts and promised gifts by the Beekhuis family of 67 19th-century Dutch landscapes are presented in the Beekhuis Foundation Gallery, including works by Johannes Hermanus Koekkoek and his descendants, and various painters of the Hague School.

The Crocker's holdings of European art after 1900 are small, but include one of Northern California's most significant collections of works by Renoir, in part due to gifts from the artist's grandson, Alain Renoir, a professor at the University of California, Berkeley. These include three small bronzes, two terra cotta relief sculptures, a Cagnes landscape painting, and works on paper, and also a ceramic vase by Jean Renoir. Works after 1900 also include two portraits of Crocker family members by Giovanni Boldini.

Works on paper
The collection of approximately 1,500 Old Master drawings include examples from the major European schools. Collection strengths include European drawings from the 17th and 18th centuries. Major drawings by artists such as Albrecht Dürer, Fra Bartolommeo, François Boucher, and Jean-Honoré Fragonard are represented. American photography and modern and contemporary California prints are also strengths of the works on paper collection.

Asian Art
The collection began with a gift of Korean ceramics by Judge E.B. and Margaret Crocker's daughter Jennie Crocker Fassett in the 1920s. The collection of Asian art is noted for its holdings of Chinese tomb furnishings and trade ceramics, and Japanese armor and tea ware. South and Southeast Asia are well represented through the William and Edith Cleary gift of more than 600 Indian and Persian miniature paintings and drawings, as well as Buddhist art from the region between Pakistan and Southeast Asia.

Ceramics
Since mid-century, the Museum has followed the development of notable Californian, American, and international ceramists such as Hamada Shoji and Lucie Rie. The history of ceramics is also explored through a collection of 18th-century Meissen porcelain tableware and in the works of ancient cultures dating to the Neolithic period.

African and Oceanic art
The collection of African and Oceanic art features a variety of objects created for daily life and traditional ceremonies. The art of the Asmat of New Guinea is strikingly evidenced in the towering memorials to ancestors, called bis poles.

The Crocker-Kingsley Exhibitions
A biennial exhibition has been held by the museum in cooperation with the Kingsley Art Club since 1927, and juried since 1940. Artists whose works have appeared include Robert Arneson, Elmer Bischoff, David Gilhooly, Ralph Goings, Roland Petersen, Mel Ramos, Fritz Scholder, and Wayne Thiebaud.

Museum buildings

Crocker family mansion and art gallery

In 1868, Judge Edwin B. Crocker purchased the property and existing building, built by B. F. Hastings in 1853, on the corner of Third and O Streets. In 1871 he commissioned Seth Babson (1830–1908), a local architect, to add a new building to the home to hold his growing art collection. (Babson had previously designed the home now known as the Leland Stanford Mansion in Sacramento.) Crocker asked Babson to design an elaborate gallery building in the Italianate style that would sit adjacent to the mansion and display the family's growing art collection.

Babson saw the home and gallery as an integrated complex, unique in design and demanding the finest materials. The gallery building included a bowling alley, skating rink and billiards room on the ground floor; a natural history museum and a library on the first floor; a 60 ft long ballroom, and a grand staircase. Public rooms were decorated with gold-leafed and frescoed panels, separated by long mirrors. Completed in 1874, the Crocker family mansion and art gallery are considered the masterpieces of Babson's career.

The family mansion went through several uses and reconstructions until a 1989 renovation restored the historic façade and created a modern gallery interior.

2010 expansion
On October 10, 2010 the Crocker Art Museum opened a new  building designed by Gwathmey Siegel & Associates Architects founded by architect Charles Gwathmey of group The New York Five. The custom facade system was designed and supplied by Overgaard Ltd., Hong Kong. The new building, named the Teel Family Pavilion, is attached to the museum's historic structures.

The original museum accommodated only 4 percent of the museum's collection; 15 percent was displayed at the opening of the new section.

The expanded Museum includes a new education center with four studio art classrooms, an art education resource room for teachers and docents, an expanded library, and student and community exhibition galleries, as well as an auditorium and public gathering places.

Selected collection highlights

References

Further reading
 William Breazeale, Cara Denison, Stacey Sell, and Freyda Spira, A Pioneering Collection: Master Drawings from the Crocker Art Museum. London: Paul Holberton Publishing, 2010.
 William Breazeale, Susan Anderson, Christine Giviskos, and Christiane Andersson, The Language of the Nude: Four Centuries of Drawing the Human Body. Lund Humphries, 2008.
 Diana L. Daniels, Martha Drexler Lynn, The Vase and Beyond: The Sidney Swidler Collection of the Contemporary Vessel. Crocker Art Museum, 2010.
 Janice T. Driesbach, Catherine Church Holland and Harvey Jones, Art of the Gold Rush. University of California Press, 1998.
 Thomas DaCosta Kaufmann, Central European Drawings in the Collection of the Crocker Art Museum. Turnhout, Belgium: Harvey Miller Publishers, 2004.
 K.D. Kurutz, "The Crocker Art Museum," California History, Vol. 71, No. 1 (Spring, 1992).
 Susan Landauer, California Impressionists. Georgia Museum of Art, 1996.
 Pierre Rosenberg, "Twenty French Drawings in Sacramento," Master Drawings, Vol. 8, No. 1 (Spring, 1970), pp. 31–39+83-101.
 Scott A. Shields, Lial A. Jones, William Breazeale, Diana Daniels, Nancy Tingley, and Erin Aitali, The Crocker Art Museum Collection Unveiled. Crocker Art Museum, 2010.
 Kevin Taylor, "The Crocker Museum: A Tale of Two Daughters," www.aimeecrocker.com, June 7, 2020.

External links
  Crocker Art Museum Website
 Crocker Art Museum collections—image galleries
 @Crocker - Twitter
  Crocker Art Museum Digital Collections Website (defunct)
 Gwathmey Siegel & Associates Architects: The Crocker Art Museum Addition and Renovation
  Crocker Museum: A Tale of Two Daughters
Crocker Art Museum within Google Arts & Culture

Buildings and structures on the National Register of Historic Places in California
California Historical Landmarks
Museums in Sacramento, California
Institutions accredited by the American Alliance of Museums
Art museums and galleries in California
Italianate architecture in California
Victorian architecture in California
Infrastructure completed in 1871
Art museums established in 1885
Asian art museums in California
1885 establishments in California
National Register of Historic Places in Sacramento, California
Crocker family